RAF Hospital Nocton Hall was a 740-bed RAF hospital in Nocton, Lincolnshire serving the predominantly RAF personnel based at the large number of RAF Stations in the area.

History
Officially designated as No. 1 RAF Hospital Nocton Hall, the facility opened for medical use in June 1947.

The hospital was situated in the grounds of Nocton Hall which was used to provide accommodation for female officers. The hospital was used by forces personnel, their families and local civilians until it closed as an RAF facility on 31 March 1983.

In 1984 it was leased to the United States Air Force (USAF) for use as a wartime contingency hospital. During the Gulf War, over 1,300 US medical staff were sent to the hall and many were billeted at RAF Scampton, although ultimately only 35 casualties had to be treated. In its later days 13 American personnel remained to keep the hospital serviceable. The USAF handed back RAF Nocton Hall to the UK Government on 30 September 1995.

The only accessible part of the hospital is the site of the former married quarters, which had been built nearby.

References

Bibliography

Hospital buildings completed in 1947
Nocton
Military units and formations established in 1940
Nocton
Military units and formations disestablished in 1983
Defunct hospitals in England
Hospitals in Lincolnshire
North Kesteven District
Military hospitals in the United Kingdom
Medical installations of the United States Air Force
Royal Air Force Medical Services